The men's 50 kilometres walk competition at the 1998 Asian Games in Bangkok, Thailand was held on 18 December.

Schedule
All times are Indochina Time (UTC+07:00)

Results
Legend
DNF — Did not finish

References

External links
Results

Men's 50 kilometres walk
1998